James (Jame) Monroe Carney (born November 29, 1968) is an American former professional cyclist. He has made two Olympic Teams (1992 Barcelona, Spain and 2000 Sydney, Australia). In 2000, he placed 5th in the 40 kilometer Points Race, currently the best finish by an American in that event. Since 2002, Jame elevated his coaching efforts and started to take on aspiring young athletes. In 2008, he took the position of Competition Director of the Cheerwine Woman’s Professional Cycling Team. This Team was the #1 ranked Women’s Team in the United States at the conclusion of the season. Over the past 2 years, he has won many of the premiere US Track cycling events. At the age of 42, he finished 7th place at the Cali, Colombia World Cup and 5th place at the Beijing, China World Cup. Jame won his 22nd National Title at the 2012 Elite Track National Championships.

For the past 2 years, Carney has managed and directed nationally ranked elite women's cycling teams. James is the competition director of the Colavita/Fine Cooking Professional Women's Cycling Team for the 2014 race season.

In 2012, Carney was elected to the Board of Directors for USA Cycling. He also is the representative of cycling for the USOC Athlete Advisory Council and the Male Athlete Representative for the USA Cycling, Inc. track cycling committee.

He is the founder and president of the 501(c)3 non-profit organization C.A.R.E. for Cycling, Inc (2011).

Major achievements

2 Time Olympian 

-  1992 Barcelona, Spain

-  2000 Sydney, AUS

2 Time World Cup Champion

-  2001 Points Race

-  2002 Scratch Race

22 time Elite National Track Champion

2005 UCI Track World Cup #1, scratch race, 1st

2004 National Champion, points race, team pursuit

2003 Pan American Games Bronze Medalist, madison

2002 National Champion, team pursuit, points race, madison, scratch race

2001 National Champion, team pursuit, points race, madison

See also
List of Pennsylvania State University Olympians

References

External links
James Carney at cyclingarchives.com

1968 births
Living people
American male cyclists
Olympic cyclists of the United States
Cyclists at the 1992 Summer Olympics
Cyclists at the 2000 Summer Olympics
Pan American Games medalists in cycling
Pan American Games silver medalists for the United States
Pan American Games bronze medalists for the United States
Cyclists at the 1999 Pan American Games